George Radwanski (February 28, 1947 – September 18, 2014) was a Canadian public servant, policy adviser, journalist and author.

Journalism
In 1965 he began working as a reporter for the Montreal Gazette subsequently becoming a columnist, associate editor and national affairs columnist for the paper. He then moved to the Financial Times of Canada where he worked as the national affairs columnist and Ottawa editor. In the late 1970s he went to the Toronto Star where he served as editorial page editor and then editor-in-chief.

In his journalism career, Radwanski won two National Newspaper Awards for editorial writing. In 1971, he published No Mandate But Terror with Kendal Windeyer, an account of the October Crisis.  In 1978, he published Trudeau, a best-selling political biography of then-Prime Minister Pierre Elliot Trudeau.

Radwanski Report
Radwanski resigned from the Star in 1985 and accepted an appointment by Ontario Premier David Peterson to head up an inquiry for the Ministry of Education into Ontario's drop-out report.

Radwanski's findings were published in 1987 as the Ontario Study of the Relevance of Education, and the Issue of Dropouts commonly known as the Radwanski Report.  Radwanski concluded that the education system had become irrelevant due to the economy's shift from manufacturing to services. He found that students were uninterested in what they were being taught and did not gain the skills and knowledge necessary to succeed in a modern economy.

He issued a series of recommendations including the implementation of early childhood education, standardized testing, "destreaming" of high schools, an "outcome-based" education and the replacement of the credit system with a common core curriculum.

Several of his recommendations were taken up by subsequent governments including destreaming in grade nine (though not later), an outcomes-based curriculum in grades 1 to 9 and standardized testing at various levels.

Following his study, Radwanski became a public policy and communications consultant in both the public and private sectors. In 1996 he was appointed by the federal government to conduct a review of Canada Post Corporation's mandate.

Radwanski also served as a speech writer to Prime Minister Jean Chrétien, who later appointed him Privacy Commissioner.

Privacy Commissioner
As Privacy Commissioner, Radwanski was outspoken in his criticism of increased surveillance by the state in the wake of the 9-11 attacks early in his tenure and the subsequent "War on Terror". In his annual report in the months following 9-11, he asserted:

"The fundamental human right of privacy in Canada is under assault as never before. Unless the Government of Canada is quickly dissuaded from its present course by Parliamentary action and public insistence, we are on a path that may well lead to the permanent loss not only of privacy rights but also important elements of freedom as we now know it..."

"The Government is, quite simply, using September 11 as an excuse for new [surveillance databases] that cannot be justified by the requirements of anti-terrorism and that, indeed, have no place in a free and democratic society..." 

Radwanski successfully campaigned against and brought an end to major federal government intrusions on privacy rights, including provisions of Bill C-36 that would have undermined the Privacy Act; the opening of letter mail by Customs agents; and the creation of a comprehensive, all-purpose seven-year Canada Customs and Revenue Agency data base on the foreign travel activities of all Canadians. He initiated a Charter challenge, later aborted by his successor, against RCMP video surveillance of public streets as a municipal police force in Kelowna, B.C., and gave 93 speeches in less than three years across Canada and abroad, along with hundreds of media interviews, to raise public awareness about privacy issues in the post-9/11 environment. He also oversaw the smooth implementation of the new federal private sector privacy law, the Personal Information Protection and Electronic Documents Act, that came into effect beginning in 2001.

Radwanski resigned in June 2003, less than half way into his seven-year term, while under attack by a parliamentary committee for lavish spending. An investigation by the parliamentary committee charged that he racked up $500,000 in travel and hospitality expenses and misled the House of Commons of Canada over lax spending practices in his office. The committee also accused Radwanski of falsifying a document sent to it. On November 6, 2003, Radwanski apologized to Parliament "without reservation" for showing lack of respect, and expressed remorse for "errors in judgment with regard to administrative and financial matters" during his tenure. MPs later voted unanimously to find him in contempt of Parliament for providing misleading information about his spending.

On March 15, 2006 he was charged with fraud and breach of trust following a 26-month-long Royal Canadian Mounted Police investigation into his expense claims while a public servant that was prompted by the Auditor General's report. 
He was acquitted on all counts on February 13, 2009, although his former chief of staff Art Lamarche was convicted for breach of trust by an Ontario Court judge. Criminal lawyer Mr. Michael A. Crystal defended George Radwanski pro bono from a matter of principle.

Personal
He was born in 1947 in Baden-Baden, West Germany. Radwanski attended Loyola High School before earning degrees in political science and law from McGill University.

His son, Adam Radwanski, is a political affairs columnist for The Globe and Mail. George Radwanski died of a heart attack on September 18, 2014.

References

External links
  Radwanski charged with fraud Canadian Press, March 15, 2006.
 Privacy, Autonomy, and the Limits of Technology text of a March 26, 2001 lecture by Radwanski while he was Privacy Commissioner. Prefaced by a short biography.
 Former privacy czar Radwanski acquitted of fraud charges CBC Feb.13, 2009
 Acquittal ends 'nightmare' for Radwanski  Globe and Mail Feb.14, 2009

Canadian newspaper journalists
Canadian male journalists
Canadian people of Polish descent
Writers from Montreal
2014 deaths
1947 births
Privacy Commissioners of Canada